Letitia Michelle Wright (born 31 October 1993) is a Guyanese-British actress. She began her career with guest roles in the television series Top Boy, Coming Up, Chasing Shadows, Humans, Doctor Who, and Black Mirror. For the latter, she received a Primetime Emmy Award nomination. She then had her breakthrough for her role in the 2015 film Urban Hymn, for which the British Academy of Film and Television Arts (BAFTA) named Wright among the 2015 group of BAFTA Breakthrough Brits.

In 2018, she attained global recognition for her portrayal of Shuri in the Marvel Cinematic Universe film Black Panther, for which she won an NAACP Image Award and a SAG Award. She reprised the role in Avengers: Infinity War (2018), Avengers: Endgame (2019), and Black Panther: Wakanda Forever (2022). In 2019, she received the BAFTA Rising Star Award. She also appeared in Steve McQueen's 2020 anthology series Small Axe, which earned her a Satellite Award nomination.

Early life and education
Letitia Michelle Wright was born on 31 October 1993 in Georgetown, Guyana. She has one brother, Ivan Bombokka. Her family moved to London, England, when she was eight years old, and she attended Northumberland Park Community School. while her brother relocated to Europe.

On 1 February 2023, she was awarded an Honorary Doctorate in Arts and Letters from the University of Guyana at an Extraordinary Convocation Ceremony.

Career

Wright performed in school plays, but she credits her desire to be a professional actress to seeing the 2006 film Akeelah and the Bee. She found Keke Palmer's performance inspiring, remarking that the role "resonated. It's one of the reasons why I'm here". She attended the Identity School of Acting, enrolling at the age of 16. 

In 2011, she appeared as a recurring role in the series Top Boy and in two episodes of Holby City. She had a small role in the 2012 film My Brother the Devil, for which she was recognized by Screen International as one of its 2012 Stars of Tomorrow. Michael Caton-Jones cast Wright in her first leading role in Urban Hymn (2015), which brought her to the attention of Hollywood. The same year, she appeared in the Doctor Who episode Face the Raven, and the following year, she began a recurring role as Renie on Humans. During this time, she also appeared in the play Eclipsed (written by Danai Gurira) at London's Gate Theatre. In 2017, Wright starred in the Black Mirror episode "Black Museum"; her performance earned her a Primetime Emmy Award nomination for Outstanding Supporting Actress in a Limited Series or Movie.

Wright co-starred in the 2018 film Black Panther, playing the role of Shuri, King T'Challa's sister and princess of Wakanda. Part of the Marvel Cinematic Universe, the film also starred Chadwick Boseman, Michael B. Jordan, Lupita Nyong'o, and Danai Gurira. Wright won the NAACP Image Award for Outstanding Breakthrough Performance in a Motion Picture for her work in the film, and reprised the role in Avengers: Infinity War, which was released two months later. Also in 2018, Wright appeared as Reb in Steven Spielberg's film adaptation of the 2011 science-fiction novel Ready Player One. Wright features as one of the cameos in Drake's music video for "Nice for What".

In 2018, Wright was also featured in a play called The Convert, which was staged at London's Young Vic Theatre. The play was the story of an English-speaking missionary in the 19th century, where the Africans were trained to speak Victorian English and engage in Christianity. This play was set in 1895, when a Black male Catholic teacher and missionary called Chilford occupies a mission house in Rhodesian Salisbury. Wright plays the character of a Jekesai, a young Rhodesia girl who is being forced into marriage by her uncle, but luckily is saved by Chilford.

In 2019, Wright won the BAFTA Rising Star Award. In April 2019, Wright appeared alongside Donald Glover and Rihanna in Guava Island, a short musical film released by Amazon Studios, before reprising her role as Shuri in Avengers: Endgame.

In November 2018, it was announced that Wright would be starring alongside John Boyega in a novel adaptation of Hold Back The Stars. Wright appeared in 2022's Death on the Nile. She was also cast in Steve McQueen's mini-series Small Axe, set in London's West Indian community between the 1960s and 1980s. In the first episode, Mangrove, which premiered on BBC One on 15 November 2020, Wright plays British Black Panther leader Altheia Jones-LeCointe, who, along with eight other Black activists, was arrested and charged with inciting a riot after a peaceful protest in 1970. Wright earned "Best Supporting Actress" nominations for this role, bringing "focussed energy and passion" to her depiction of the real-life Jones-LeCointe, as noted by The New Yorker.

In February 2020, it was announced that Wright had accepted to play twin sisters June and Jennifer Gibbons in the film The Silent Twins, based on the 1986 book of the same name by Marjorie Wallace, with shooting beginning in April. The film was released in September 2022. 

Wright returned as Shuri for Black Panther: Wakanda Forever, which depicts Shuri becoming the new Black Panther following the death of T'Challa; the film marked her first leading role. Released in November 2022, the film was made in honor of Chadwick Boseman, who died from colon cancer in 2020. During the filming of a chase sequence in August 2021, she fractured her shoulder and suffered a concussion following a motorcycle accident, causing production to pause while she recuperated.

Personal life
Wright has opened up about her struggles with depression. She told Vanity Fair in 2018 that when she first experienced depression at the age of 20, she "was in the dark going through so many bad things". Wright credits her Christian faith with helping her overcome the depression, which she discovered after attending a London actors' Bible study meeting. To focus on her recovery and her faith, she turned down film roles. She later explained she "needed to take a break from acting" and "went on a journey to discover my relationship with God, and I became a Christian."

COVID-19 vaccination controversy
In December 2020, Wright generated backlash for sharing a 69-minute video from the YouTube channel On The Table on Twitter, in which Tomi Arayomi, a senior leader with the Light London church, questioned the legitimacy of the COVID-19 vaccine and accused China of spreading COVID-19, amongst other controversial statements; YouTube deleted the video for violation of its terms of service. Wright later clarified, "My intention was not to hurt anyone, my ONLY intention of posting the video was it raised my concerns with what the vaccine contains and what we are putting in our bodies. Nothing else." She subsequently left social media. 

In October 2021, The Hollywood Reporter reported that Wright had parted ways with her U.S. team of representatives due to uproar over the video and her alleged continued promotion of anti-vaccine sentiments on the set of Black Panther: Wakanda Forever during production in Atlanta. Wright returned to social media to deny these claims. 

During a November 2022 feature with Variety, Wakanda Forever co-star Angela Bassett stated that she had never heard Wright share anti-vaccine sentiments during filming, while Marvel vice president Nate Moore claimed that he did know her vaccination status, that she was not sharing her views on set, and that her status did not affect production, aside from her injuries from a motorcycle accident while filming. During the interview, her publicist and representatives evaded Varietys attempts to ask about her updated vaccinated status, instead redirecting them to Wright's prior statement in 2021. 

Later that month, Wright condemned The Hollywood Reporter for an article that included her amongst awards-season prospects with "personal baggage", in which its author Scott Feinberg compared her past comments with men accused of abuse and sexual misconduct. She reiterated that she had already apologised for her comments two years prior and had remained silent on the topic, and accused both the publication and Feinberg of having an "agenda" against her, which she described as "vile" and "disgusting" behaviour.

Filmography

Film

Television

Awards and nominations

References

External links
 

1993 births
Living people
21st-century Christians
21st-century English actresses
Actresses from London
Alumni of the Identity School of Acting
BAFTA Rising Star Award winners
Black British actresses
Converts to Christianity
English Christians
English film actresses
English television actresses
Guyanese actresses
Guyanese emigrants to England
Outstanding Performance by a Cast in a Motion Picture Screen Actors Guild Award winners
People from Georgetown, Guyana
People from Tottenham